Draga (Cyrillic: Драга) is a feminine given name.

Those bearing it include:
 Draga Obrenović (1866–1903), Queen of Serbia
 Draga Matkovic (1907–2013), classical pianist
 Draga Ahačič (1924—2023), actress and translator

See also 
 Proper names derived from Drag-
 Proper names derived from Draz-

References 

Ukrainian feminine given names
Bulgarian feminine given names
Serbian feminine given names
Slovene feminine given names
Croatian feminine given names